Convoy PQ 1 was the second of the Arctic Convoys of World War II by which the Western Allies supplied material aid to the Soviet Union in its fight with Nazi Germany. The convoy sailed from Hvalfiord in Iceland on 29 September 1941 and arrived at Archangelsk on 11 October 1941.

Arctic convoys
A convoy was defined as at least one merchant ship sailing under the protection of at least one warship. At first the British had intended to run convoys to Russia on a forty-day cycle (the number of days between convoy departures) during the winter of 1941–1942 but this was shortened to a ten-day cycle. The round trip to Murmansk for warships was three weeks' long and each convoy needed a cruiser and two destroyers, which severely depleted the Home Fleet. Anti-submarine trawlers escorted the convoys on the first part of the outbound journey and British minesweepers based at Archangelsk met the convoys to escort then for the remainder of the voyage.

Ships
This Convoy consisted of 11 merchant ships loaded with raw materials, 20 tanks and 193 crated Hawker Hurricane fighter aircraft.
The code prefix PQ was chosen from the initials of Commander Phillip Quellyn Roberts an operations officer in the Admiralty.
 Cruiser  (29 September – 11 October)
  (29 September – 4 October, detached to QP 1)
 Destroyer  (2–11 October)
Escorted ships of convoy PQ 1 in the coastal waters of the USSR (10–11 October 1941)
 Minesweeper  (10–11 October)
 Destroyers Uritski, Valerian Kuybyshev on final part of the voyage.

The ships arrived safely.

List of ships

Merchant ships
The following information is taken from Ruegg and Hague Convoys to Russia: Allied Convoys and Naval Surface Operations in Arctic Waters 1941–1945 (1993 rev.) unless indicated.

Escorts
The following information is taken from Ruegg and Hague Convoys to Russia: Allied Convoys and Naval Surface Operations in Arctic Waters 1941–1945 (1993 rev.) unless indicated.

Notes

Footnotes

References

Further reading

External links
 Russian Convoy PQ-1. www naval-history net

PQ 01